Philip of Harveng (Philip of Harvengt) (died 1183) was a twelfth-century Premonstratensian and abbot of Bonne-Espérance Abbey in Hainault (present-day Belgium), and a theological writer.

Biblical commentary

His Responsio de damnatione Salomonis addressed the puzzling biblical behaviour of Solomon. He invented novel schemes of history from the Book of Daniel in his Dream of Nebuchadnezzar (De somnio regis Nabuchodonosor)
, varying the pattern of the four monarchies.

Augustinian theology

His life of Augustine of Hippo was celebrated and influential. Drawing on Possidius, he also makes Augustine presage the regular canons. Associating the phrase docere verbo et exemplo (to teach by word and example) with the clerical life, in his De institutione clericorum, he put an emphasis on preaching. In the same work he argued in favour of social order.

Other works
He wrote much hagiography, including a life of St. Foillan. Surviving letters to Philip, Count of Flanders and Henry I, Count of Champagne argue for knightly patronage of learning.

References
G. P. Sijen, "Philippe de Harveng, abbé de Bonne-Espérance: sa biographie", Analecta Praemonstratensia vol. 14 (1938), pp. 37–52
N. J. Weyns, "A propos des Instructions pour les clercs (De Institutione Clericorum) de Philippe de Harveng", Analecta Praemonstratensia vol. 53 (1977), pp. 71-79
Carol Neel, "Philip of Harvengt and Anselm of Havelberg: The Premonstratensian Vision of Time", Church History, Vol. 62, No. 4 (December, 1993), pp. 483-493
U. G. Leinsle, "Deo militans clericus“ – Rittertum und Krieg im Werk Philipps von Harvengt", Analecta Praemonstratensia 77 (2001), pp. 94–120

Notes

External links
Philip of Harveng on Silence, Paul F. Gehl

 Biography
'An Analysis of the Correspondence and Hagiographical Works of Philip of Harvengt', Lynsey E Robertson

1183 deaths
Premonstratensians
12th-century Roman Catholic theologians
Christian hagiographers
Year of birth unknown
French abbots
Medieval French theologians
12th-century Latin writers